The Bayanihan to Recover as One Act, also known as Bayanihan 2, and officially designated as Republic Act No. 11494, is a law in the Philippines that was enacted in September 2020 granting the President additional authority to combat the COVID-19 pandemic in the Philippines.

Background 

Prior to the expiration of the Bayanihan to Heal as One Act, Congress has already been deliberating proposals to either amend the existing law or legislate a new law that would handle the economic impact of the pandemic in the country.

Legislative history 
In the Senate, the bill was introduced as Senate Bill No. 1564 with Senators Imee Marcos, Sonny Angara, Ralph Recto, Migz Zubiri, Pia Cayetano, Cynthia Villar and Senate President Tito Sotto as its principal sponsors.

On June 3, the House of Representatives adapted the Senate's version of the bill and was introduced as House Bill No. 6953 with Deputy Speaker Luis Raymund Villafuerte of Camarines Sur's 2nd district and Martin Romualdez of Leyte's 2nd district as its principal sponsors.

The final draft of the bill is a consolidation of bills filed by the bicameral Congress.

Provisions 
The act will provide government funds to stimulate the economy while strengthening the health sector and the government's pandemic responses.

See also 
 List of COVID-19 pandemic legislation
 Philippine government response to the COVID-19 pandemic

References 

COVID-19 pandemic in the Philippines
Philippine legislation
Presidency of Rodrigo Duterte
Law associated with the COVID-19 pandemic